Sumerpur, also known as Bharuwa Sumerpur, is a town and a nagar panchayat in Hamirpur district, Uttar Pradesh, India.

Demographics
As of the 2001 Census of India, Sumerpur had a population of 24,656. Males constituted 54% of the population and females 46%. Sumerpur has an average literacy rate of 59%, lower than the national average of 59.5%: male literacy is 79%, and female literacy is 62%. In Sumerpur, 27% of the population is under 6 years of age.

Industries 
Sumerpur is also famous in region for housing two major industries these are:

 Hindustan Unilever Limited
 Rimjhim Ispat Ltd.

Sumerpur's famous shoes (leather ) are included in Uttar Pradesh's scheme One District One Product, in order to protect and revive this indigenous and specialized product.

Transport 
Situated at about 15 km from district headquarters, 80 km from Kanpur well connected via NH 34 and 27.Sumerpur is also well connected to some major railway stations as Lucknow, Kanpur, Mumbai, Gorakhpur, Durg, Katni, Ragaul, Banda, Satna, Jhansi, Haridwar, Jabalpur, Chitrakoot.

Nearest airport are Kanpur Airport (domestic) and Chaudhary Charan Singh International Airport.

References

Cities and towns in Hamirpur district, Uttar Pradesh